Dilly is a crater in the Elysium quadrangle of Mars, located at 13.24° North and 202.9° West.  It is only 1.3 km in diameter and was named after Dilly, a town in Mali.

Impact craters generally have a rim with ejecta around them, in contrast volcanic craters usually do not have a rim or ejecta deposits.  As craters get larger (greater than 10 km in diameter) they usually have a central peak. The peak is caused by a rebound of the crater floor following the impact.

See also 
 Impact crater
 Impact event
 List of craters on Mars
 Ore resources on Mars
 Planetary nomenclature

References

Impact craters on Mars
Elysium quadrangle